The Faculty of Political Science of the University of Ankara (more simply known as "SBF") is the oldest faculty of social science in Turkey, being the successor of the "Mekteb-i Mülkiye" (also known as the "Mülkiye") which was established in Istanbul on February 12, 1859, under the reign of Sultan Abdulaziz, then moved to Ankara in 1936 under a new name, and was incorporated to Ankara University on April 3, 1950, under its current name. The Faculty of Political Science provides higher education in the fields of Social Science, Public Finance, Economics, Public Administration, Labor Economics, Business Administration and International Relations.
It is considered to be one of the most influential institutes in the political life of Turkey.

History
The faculty was founded in Istanbul as a community college in 1859 and has undergone series of changes since the establishment. It was named Mekteb-i Mülkiye-i Şahane under the Ministry of Internal Affairs but in 1918 the name was changed to "Mekteb-i Mülkiye" under the Ministry of Education. After the founding of the Republic, at the request of Atatürk, the school was moved to Ankara, and named the School of Political Science. The length of study was also increased to 4 years. On March 23, 1950, the school was placed under Ankara University, and its name was changed to Ankara University, Faculty of Political Science. The school has been a symbol of freedom of expression and organization. Holders of every different political view have found there an environment in which they could freely express themselves on a democratic platform as an important difference between Mülkiye and other universities.

Masters and Doctorate programs were implemented in the 1955-56 academic year. In 1982, the faculty adopted the new framework, increasing the number of specialization departments to six: International Relations, Political Science and Public Administration, Economics, Public Finance, Business Administration, Labor Economics and Industrial Relations. Since the 2008-2009 academic year, Foreign Language Preparatory School has been mandatory.

Staff and Alumni
The faculty currently has 172 academic staff (42 professors, 33 associate professors, 34 assistant professors, 18 research assistants with doctorates, 35 research assistants pursuing doctorate degrees, four lecturers and six experts) and 78 administrative staff.

The faculty's alumni, who are also called Mülkìyelìler, are employed in the Ministry of Foreign Affairs, Internal Affairs, Public Finance and in public institutions including banks and private companies. A number of alumni have served as prime ministers, ministers, deputies, ambassadors, and governors.

Mülkiyeliler Birliği, the faculty's Alumni Association is a non-governmental organization with branches across the country. It organizes variety of courses, seminars, symposiums and exhibitions. It also publishes magazines and books.

Education Facilities
The faculty has several teaching facilities to meet the needs of various courses and departments. In addition to the two amphis, the faculty has a 450-seat conference hall, several large classrooms, seminar rooms, multipurpose rooms and computer centers.

For all departments, English language preparation classes have been mandatory since 2008-2009. In addition, foreign language courses are available. Since the 1992-1993 academic year, language courses covering the departmental terminology have been given as electives.

The library specializes in the field of social sciences. There are 108,000 Turkish and foreign language books. The library has a collection of 46,000 domestic and overseas periodicals and newspaper collections of historical value. The library has a 300-seat reading room, as well as the "Hande Mumcu Reading Room" for periodicals and the "Ali Cankaya Room" with tapes and CD-ROMs.

Publications
The faculty has published the Journal of Political Science (SBF Dergisi) four times a year since 1943.

Social and Housing Facilities
In addition to a canteen (Coffee Mülkiye) and two tea centers, there is a dining room which provides service to faculty, academic and administrative staff.

Although there are many student dormitories at the University of Ankara, they are not sufficient to accommodate all students. To compensate this shortcoming, there are many private and state dormitories in Ankara which give housing services to students.

The faculty offers a wide range of social and sporting activities including theater, cinema, art, music and dance ensembles, plus over 30 communities of thought.

The faculty's basketball team, Mülkiyespor, which is supported by Alumni, competes in the secondary league.

Traditional Cow Festival
One of the most colorful aspects of social life in the faculty is the traditional cow festival organized once a year since the 1930s, prior to final exams. The Cow Festival is the famous celebration when the top student in a given class is forced to parade the streets on a cow – a play on words since “cow” is slang for nerd in Turkish. It is organized by a Festival Organization Committee (Feskom) elected from third and fourth year students. Faculty members, students and alumni join in the opening ceremony, reading the prayer of that year together. A "reading cow sculpture" was built in front of the faculty by the Festival Organization Committee 2000.

Notable alumni
Hashim al-Atassi (1875 - 1960), statesman and President of Syria from 1936 to 1939, 1949 to 1951, and 1954 to 1955.
Abdülkadir Aksu (born 1944), politician
Mehmet Ağar (born 1951), police chief, politician, government minister and leader of the Democratic Party (DP)
Rıdvan Akar (born 1961), journalist and author
Ekrem Alican (1916-2000), politician, government minister and leader of the New Turkey Party (YTP)
Ertuğrul Apakan (born 1947), diplomat
Sadun Aren (1922–2008), Academic and politician
İnal Batu (1936-2013), diplomat and politician
Hikmet Bilâ (1954-2011), journalist and columnist
Necdet Calp (1922-1998), civil servant and politician
Nurettin Canikli (born 1960) Deputy Prime Minister of Turkey
Cengiz Çandar (born 1948), journalist and former war correspondent
Mevlüt Çavuşoğlu (born 1968), politician and  Minister of Foreign Affairs of Turkey since 24 November 2015
Hikmet Çetin (born 1937), politician, former Minister of Foreign Affairs and former leader of the Republican People's Party (CHP)
Sulejman Delvina (1884-1932), Albanian politician
Nexhip Draga (1867-1920), Albanian politician
Shukri al-Quwatli (1891-1967)  the first President of post-independence Syria from 1943 to 1949, from 1955 to 22 February 1958
Abdullah Öcalan (born 1946), Kurdistan Workers' Party leader and political thinker
Halil Ergün (born 1946), actor
Rauf Fico (born 1881), Albanian politician and diplomat
Mesut Yılmaz (born 1947), politician and former Prime Minister
Vecdi Gönül (born 1939), politician and former Minister of National Defence of Turkey
Şükrü Sina Gürel (born 1950), diplomat, politician and former Minister of Foreign Affairs
Aydın Güven Gürkan (1941-2006), academic, politician, former Minister of Labor and Social Security, and leader of the People's Party (HP) and Social Democratic Populist Party (SHP)
Hasan Celal Güzel (born 1946), politician and journalist
Necip Hablemitoğlu (1954-2002), historian and intellectual
Vahit Melih Halefoğlu (born 1919), diplomat, politician and former Minister of Foreign Affairs
Mustafa Kamalak (born 1948), politician and leader of the Felicity Party (SP)
Cezmi Kartay (1920-2000), civil servant, politician and leader of the Social Democracy Party (SODEP)
Ahmet Taner Kışlalı (1939-1999), academic, political scientist, columnist, intellectual
Atilla Koç (born 1946), politician and former Minister of Culture and Tourism 
İsmet Kotak (1939–2011), Turkish Cypriot politician, public administrator, journalist and columnist
Hayri Kozakçıoğlu (1938-2013), high-ranking civil servant and politician
Yalçın Küçük (born 1938), writer, philosopher, economist and historian
Ferit Melen (1906-1988), civil servant, politician and former Prime Minister
Altan Öymen (born 1932), journalist, author, politician and former leader of the Republican People's Party (CHP)
Abdüllatif Şener (born 1954), academic, politician, former Finance Minister and Deputy Prime Minister, leader of the Turkey Party (TP)
Aras Onur (born 1982), author, poet
İlber Ortaylı (born 1947) academic and historian
Adnan Sezgin (born 1954), former footballer
Feridun Sinirlioğlu (born 1956), Minister of Foreign Affairs of Turkey in the interim election government in 2015; the Undersecretary to the Foreign Ministry
Nabi Şensoy (born 1945), former ambassador of Turkey to the United States
Emre Taner (born 1942), civil servant and former chief of the National Intelligence Organization (MİT) 
Osman Nuri Tekeli (born 1893-date of death unknown), civil servant and province governor
Mümtaz'er Türköne (born 1956) academic and author
Rıza Türmen (born 1941), former judge of the European Court of Human Rights
Ahmet Üzümcü (born 1951), diplomat and director-general of the Organisation for the Prohibition of Chemical Weapons
Hamdi Ulukaya (born 1972), entrepreneur, businessman and founder of Chobani
  Mustafa Cengiz (1949 - 2021) Turkish Businessmen, Former and One of the most successful President of Galatasaray SK

Mülkiye March
Mülkiye March was composed by Musa Süreyya and its lyrics were written by Cemal Edhem (Yeşil) as alumni of Class of 1921. Its first two lines translated as: "We do not want another love, because it is your love in our hearts; stop weeping, beloved country, because we have arrived."

See also
 Ankara University

External links
Mekteb-i Mülkiye official website 
 http://www.politics.ankara.edu.tr/resimler/rozet.gif

Notes

1859 establishments in the Ottoman Empire
Education in the Ottoman Empire
Ankara University
Political science in Turkey
Political science education